The slate-colored solitaire (Myadestes unicolor) is a species of bird in the family Turdidae. It is found in Belize, El Salvador, Guatemala, Honduras, Mexico, and Nicaragua. Its natural habitat is subtropical or tropical moist montane forests.

Gallery

References

External links
Stamps (for El Salvador)
Slate-colored solitaire photo gallery VIREO

slate-colored solitaire
Birds of Mexico
Birds of Guatemala
Birds of Honduras
Birds of Nicaragua
slate-colored solitaire
slate-colored solitaire
Taxonomy articles created by Polbot